The Latvian First League is the second tier of football in Latvia and is organised by the Latvian Football Federation.

History 
The league was founded together with other Latvian football competitions in 1992. From 2007 to 2008, the tournament was known as the Traffic 1. līga, due to its first sponsorship deal concluded with the "Traffic auto advert" advertising company. From 2015 its name was Komanda.lv First League (Komanda.lv 1. līga) for sponsorship reasons, after the Komanda.lv sporting goods store became the league's main sponsor in 2015.

Format
There are 14 clubs in the First League. During the course of the season each club plays the every other club twice, once at home and once away, with a total of 28 games. At the end of the season, the highest placed club is automatically promoted to the Virslīga. The second lowest placed club in the Virslīga and the second placed club in the First League compete in a two-legged tie for the remaining place in the following season's Virslīga. The two clubs finishing at the bottom of the First League are relegated to the Second League, while the third-from-bottom team competes in a two-legged tie with the third-placed team of the Second League for a place in the First League.

First League clubs (2022)
14 clubs are taking part in the 2022 Komanda.lv 1.līga season:

 Rēzeknes FA/BJSS (Rēzekne)
 FS Jelgava (Jelgava)
 Grobiņas SC (Grobiņa)
 FK Dinamo Rīga (Riga)
 JDFS Alberts (Riga)
 Saldus SS/Leevon (Saldus)
 FK Smiltene (Smiltene)
 Skanstes SK (Rīga)
 AFA Olaine (Olaine)
 FK Salaspils (Salaspils)
 Riga-2 (Rīga)
 RFS-2 (Rīga)
 Valmiera FC-2 (Valmiera)
 Vecsaule FC (Bauska)

Past First League winners

a Previously won as Ranto/AVV.

References

External links 
The First League on the Latvian Football Federation website (in Latvian)
(Archive) The page of the league on the Latvian Football Federation website (in English)
  League321.com - Latvian football league tables, records & statistics database. 

 
2
Lat